No. 89 Squadron was a Royal Air Force squadron, mainly active in the fighter role during its existence.

History

Formation and World War I
No. 89 squadron was formed on 1 September 1917 as a training unit at Netheravon. The squadron was not used for operations and remained a training unit until it was disbanded on 4 July 1918.

Re-formation and World War II
The squadron was formed again on 25 September 1941 at RAF Colerne,  equipped with Bristol Beaufighter night fighters. The squadron moved out to the Middle East to defend the Nile delta and the Suez Canal. On 3 March 1942 the squadron scored its first victory when it shot down a German Luftwaffe Heinkel He 111. The squadron was active in the Mediterranean area, sending aircraft to Malta and Algiers, and in 1943 sought targets over Crete and later Sicily. With the withdrawal further north of the German night fighter units, the squadron moved first to Ceylon, then in the summer of 1944 to Burma on intruder missions. The aircraft withdrew from operations to convert to the de Havilland Mosquito. Apart from leaflet dropping from Singapore, there was little for the squadron to do and it was disbanded on 1 May 1946.

1950s
With the expansion of RAF Fighter Command in the mid-1950s, the squadron was re-formed on 15 September 1955 at RAF Stradishall and equipped with the de Havilland Venom NF.3. Two years later, these were replaced with the Gloster Javelin. It only flew for a year as an all-weather fighter squadron and was disbanded on 30 November 1957, when it was re-numbered as 85 Squadron.

Aircraft operated

Commanding officers

References

Notes

Bibliography

 Flintham, Vic and Andrew Thomas. Combat Codes: A full explanation and listing of British, Commonwealth and Allied air force unit codes since 1938. Shrewsbury, Shropshire, UK: Airlife Publishing Ltd., 2003. .
 Halley, James J. The Squadrons of the Royal Air Force & Commonwealth 1918-1988. Tonbridge, Kent, UK: Air Britain (Historians) Ltd., 1988. .
 Jefford, C.G. RAF Squadrons, a Comprehensive record of the Movement and Equipment of all RAF Squadrons and their Antecedents since 1912. Shrewsbury, Shropshire, UK: Airlife Publishing, 1988 (second edition 2001). .
 Rawlings, John D.R. Fighter Squadrons of the RAF and their Aircraft. London: Macdonald & Jane's (Publishers) Ltd., 1969 (2nd edition 1976, reprinted 1978). .

External links

089
089
Military units and formations established in 1917
No. 89
1917 establishments in the United Kingdom